William Quincy Murphy, Jr. (August 18, 1952 – August 2, 2013) was an American businessman and politician.

Born in Atlanta, Georgia, Murphy graduated from North Carolina Agricultural and Technical State University. He owned an insurance company in Augusta, Georgia: Quincy Murphy and Associates. He served in the Georgia House of Representatives as a Democrat from 2002 until his death from cancer. He died in Augusta, Georgia.

References

1952 births
2013 deaths
Politicians from Atlanta
Politicians from Augusta, Georgia
North Carolina A&T State University alumni
Businesspeople from Georgia (U.S. state)
Democratic Party members of the Georgia House of Representatives
21st-century American politicians
Deaths from cancer in Georgia (U.S. state)
20th-century American businesspeople